Netta Barzilai (born 22 January 1993), also known mononymously as Netta, is an Israeli singer. After winning the fifth season of HaKokhav HaBa, she earned the right to represent her country at the Eurovision Song Contest 2018. On 12 May 2018, she won the contest, held in Lisbon, Portugal, with her song "Toy", marking Israel's fourth win in the Eurovision Song Contest (after 1978, 1979, and 1998).

Early life

Barzilai was born in Hod HaSharon, Israel. Her mother is from a Maghrebi Jewish family (of Moroccan-Jewish and Libyan-Jewish descent), whereas her father is from an Ashkenazi Jewish family (of Polish-Jewish descent). She has two brothers. As a child, Barzilai lived in Nigeria for six years, where her father, who is an engineer, worked on a project for Israeli company Solel Boneh.

Barzilai attended Hadarim High School in Hod HaSharon and was a youth leader in the HaNoar HaOved VeHaLomed youth movement. Prior to her military service in the Israel Defense Forces, she spent a Service Year volunteering in the paramilitary Nahal. She completed her military service in the Israeli Navy Band. Afterwards, she studied electronic music at the Rimon School of Jazz and Contemporary Music, however she did not complete a degree there.

Career

Eurovision Song Contest 

In September 2017, Barzilai auditioned for season five of HaKokhav HaBa, Israel's national selection for the Eurovision Song Contest, with "Rude Boy" by Rihanna. After receiving 82% of the votes, she advanced to the second stage of the competition in which she sang "Hey Mama" by David Guetta. In February 2018, she performed "Wannabe" by the Spice Girls, and although she lost a duel to Ricky Ben Ari, she proceeded to the next stage after being selected by the judges.

The last song Barzilai performed in the competition was a mashup of "Gangnam Style" by Psy and "Tik Tok" by Kesha. After receiving 210 points from the judges and audience, Barzilai won first place and the right to represent Israel at Eurovision.

On 25 February 2018, it was reported that the song that Barzilai would perform at the contest would be called "Toy" and that it would be performed in English, apart from a phrase in Hebrew. The song was written and composed by Doron Medalie and Stav Beger, and produced by Berger.

The song was released on 11 March 2018, and its music video went on to receive more than 20 million views two months before the beginning of Eurovision. On 14 April 2018, Barzilai performed her song at Eurovision in Concert in Amsterdam, the largest Eurovision promotional event. Four days later, she performed the song Hora Heachzut at the torch-lighting ceremony that opened the 70th Israeli Independence Day.

On 8 May 2018, Barzilai participated in the first semi-final of the Eurovision Song Contest, winning the semi-final with 283 points and qualifying for the final on 12 May. In the final, she placed first with televoters and third with international juries, amassing 529 points in total and winning the competition, marking Israel's fourth Eurovision win (after 1978, 1979, and 1998).

Shortly after winning Eurovision, Barzilai signed a worldwide record deal with New York-based label S-Curve Records. On 1 February 2019, Barzilai released her follow-up single "Bassa Sababa", alongside a music video filmed in Kyiv with Eddie Kabtner.

At the Eurovision Song Contest 2019 held in Tel Aviv, Barzilai opened the first semi-final with a new version of her winning song "Toy". During the final she sang a new single, "Nana Banana".

Post-Eurovision projects 
Barzilai began appearing around the world between Pride parades across Europe and TV programs in the United States. The record was set on 19 October 2019, when she appeared at the Zhejiang Satellite TV Autumn Festival in China in front of approximately 500 million television viewers and tens of thousands in the audience.

At Hanukkah 2019, Barzilai began performing in the show "Pop Up Music 2" alongside Omer Adam, Keren Peles, Moshe Peretz and more. In November, they released the theme song of the show "We Got The Power" together with Adam, Moshe Peretz and Rotem Cohen who participated alongside her in the show. She later released a duet with Adam, titled "Beg".

On 7 February 2020 she released a new song, titled "Ricki Lake". In addition, Barzilai debuted a new project titled Netta's Office, a series of YouTube videos in which she remixes songs using her trademark looper. In the same year she participated in the new version of the program "We Will Not Stop Singing" on Channel 12. Barzilai competed in the first episode alongside Keren Peles and Moshe Peretz and won the episode.

On 16 May 2020, she performed a new song, "Cuckoo", during the Eurovision: Europe Shine a Light special event. Her debut EP Goody Bag was released soon after on 25 June, containing all five singles she had released up until that point: "Toy", "Bassa Sababa", "Nana Banana", "Ricki Lake" and "Cuckoo". She later made a cameo in the Netflix film Eurovision Song Contest: The Story of Fire Saga. A second EP titled The Best of Netta's Office, Vol. 1 was released on 18 December, containing six of her remixes seen in the Netta's Office series. She served as a judge on the fourth season of The X Factor Israel, which determined the Israeli representative for the Eurovision Song Contest 2022.

On 13 October 2021, Barzilai released "CEO" and "Dum", her first new solo music in over a year, and first since leaving her previous label Tedy Productions for a complete transition to S-Curve Records. Further singles in 2022 included "I Love My Nails" and "Playground Politica" (with Nigerian-born Ghana-based singer Mr Eazi).

Discography

Extended plays

Singles

As lead artist

As featured artist

Other charted songs

Filmography

See also
Music in Israel
Culture of Israel

References

External links

1993 births
21st-century Sephardi Jews
21st-century Israeli women singers
Eurovision Song Contest entrants of 2018
Eurovision Song Contest winners
Israeli dance musicians
Eurovision Song Contest entrants for Israel
Israeli expatriates in Nigeria
Israeli people of Libyan-Jewish descent
Israeli people of Moroccan-Jewish descent
Israeli people of Polish-Jewish descent
Israeli pop singers
Living people
People from Hod HaSharon
Israeli military musicians
Israeli Ashkenazi Jews
Israeli Sephardi Jews
Women in electronic music